Umka and Bronevik ("Umka and the Armoured Car"), sometimes abbreviated as Umka & Bro, is a Russian band playing in the American and British guitar rock styles of 1960-1970s, ranging from classic rhythm-and-blues to psychedelic.

The present band members are:

 Anna Gerasimova ("Umka"), lead singer, songwriter
 Boris Kanunnikov, lead guitar
 Mikhail Trofimenko, bass guitar
 Boris Markov, drums
 Igor Oistrakh, harp

Umka's songs and the Bronevik music are influenced by Grateful Dead, Iggy Pop, Bob Dylan, Jack Kerouac, as well as Russian Silver Age poets: Daniil Kharms, Osip Mandelshtam, Alexander Vvedensky.

Discography 
Note: only the CDs listed on the English official site are listed here. 
1998 The CD
1998 To Command The Parade (Командовать парадом)
1999 Mole's Move (Ход кротом)
2000 Dandelion Movie (Кино из одуванчиков)
2000 Weltschmerz
2001 Stash (Заначка)
2002 Handicap's Paradise (Рай для инвалидов)
2003 Unplugged
2004 Victory Park (Парк Победы)
2004 Umka and Bro at AnTrop's (Умка и Броневичок на студии "АнТроп")
2005 600
2006 No Fear (Ничего страшного)
2007 Breaking Isn't Building (Ломать не строить)
2009 Closer Sessions (a vinyl LP album recorded in the USA on the Porto Franco Records label)

External links 
 Umka.ru - official website (Russian)
 Umka & Bro artist page on Porto Franco Records
 About the band at the FREE!MUSIC project
 English official website
 Albums - available for download in mp3; English version
 A short autobiography by Umka written in English
 Video and audio archive
 Live session on mastanmusic.com podcast

Musical groups from Moscow
Russian rock music groups